Gopalakrishnan s/o Subramaniam, also known as S Gopalakrishnan, is a Malaysian politician from PKR. He was the Member of Johor State Legislative Assembly for Tiram from 2018 to 2022.

Politics 
He is the Vice President of PKR Johor and Chief of Johor Indian Community Bureau.

Election result

References 

People's Justice Party (Malaysia) politicians
Members of the Johor State Legislative Assembly
Malaysian people of Indian descent
Malaysian politicians of Indian descent
Living people
Year of birth missing (living people)